Claxton Bay is a community in the Republic of Trinidad and Tobago. It is located in Central Trinidad, south of Couva and Chaguanas and north of San Fernando and is administered by the Couva–Tabaquite–Talparo Regional Corporation. Olympic cyclist Hylton Mitchell was born here.

References

Bays of Trinidad and Tobago
Trinidad (island)
Gulf of Paria
Populated places in Trinidad and Tobago
Populated coastal places in Trinidad and Tobago